The 2008–09 Maltese First Division season (known as 2008–09 BOV First Division for sponsorship reasons) started in October 2008 and ended in May 2009. Pieta Hotspurs and Mqabba were relegated from the Premier League. The promoted teams were San Gwann and Rabat Ajax. Dingli Swallows and Vittoriosa Stars finished the league as joint first with the same number of points. Both were promoted but a decider had to be played to decide who the champions would be. The decider was won by Dingli by the score of 2–1. At the other end Rabat Ajax and Senglea Athletic were relegated to the Second Division.

Teams
These teams will contest the Maltese First Division 2008-09 season:
 Dingli Swallows
 Mosta
 Mqabba
 Pietà Hotspurs
 Rabat Ajax
 San Ġwann
 St. George's
 Senglea Athletic
 St. Patrick
 Vittoriosa

Changes from previous season
 Tarxien Rainbows and Qormi were promoted to the Premier League. They were replaced with Pieta Hotspurs and Mqabba, both relegated from 2007–08 Maltese Premier League
 Mellieha and Marsa were relegated to the 2008–09 Maltese Second Division. They were replaced with San Gwann and Rabat Ajax.

League table

Championship play-offs

|}

Results

Top scorers

References

Maltese First Division seasons
Malta
2